Robert Herbert (9 March 1863 – 23 October 1920) was a Jamaican cricketer. He played in three first-class matches for the Jamaican cricket team in 1896/97.

See also
 List of Jamaican representative cricketers

References

External links
 

1863 births
1920 deaths
Jamaican cricketers
Jamaica cricketers
People from Clerkenwell